Flosta (historic: Flougstad) is a former municipality in the old Aust-Agder county in Norway. The  municipality existed from 1902 until its dissolution in 1962. It is currently part of the municipality of Arendal in Agder county. The administrative center of Flosta was at Staubø in the village of Kilsund.

History
The municipality of Dybvaag was established on 1 January 1838 (see formannskapsdistrikt law), and this municipality included all of what would later become Flosta municipality. On 1 January 1902, the new municipality of Flosta was established when the islands of Flostaøya and Tverrdalsøya and some of the mainland north of those islands (population: 1,892) separated from the municipality of Dybvaag.

During the 1960s, there were many municipal mergers across Norway due to the work of the Schei Committee. On 1 January 1962, the municipalities of Stokken (population: 2,783), Austre Moland (population: 1,607), and Flosta (population: 1,205) as well as Strengereid area in neighboring Tvedestrand (population: 375) were all merged to create the new municipality of Moland. Later, on 1 January 1992, Moland (including the area of Flosta) was merged into the municipality of Arendal.

Name
The name of the municipality (originally the parish and the church) comes from the old name for the island of Flostaøya since this is where the historic church is located.

Government

The municipal council  of Flosta was made up of 13 representatives that were elected to four year terms.  The party breakdown of the final municipal council was as follows:

See also
List of former municipalities of Norway

References

External links

Arendal
Former municipalities of Norway
1902 establishments in Norway
1962 disestablishments in Norway